The Club Sportif Sfaxien Volleyball Club (often referred to as CSS) is one of CS Sfaxien women's club's sections that represent the club in Tunisia and international volleyball competitions, the club team based in Sfax.

History 
The Club Sportif Sfaxien is a Tunisian sports team founded in 1928 in Sfax, a popular and successful volleyball team Internationally. The club has won the Tunisian Championship for 8 times, the Tunisia cup 9 times, Internationally The Club still yet to have won any title.

Technical and managerial staff

Honours

National Achievements
Tunisian League :
  Winners (08 titles) : 1998–99, 2002–03, 2003–04, 2005–06, 2008–09, 2009–10, 2011–12, 2018–19
  Runners-Up :
Tunisian Cup : 
  Winners (09 cups) : 1999–20, 2004–05, 2007–08, 2008–09, 2011–12, 2012–13, 2013–14, 2017–18, 2018–19
  Runners-Up :
Tunisian Super Cup : 
  Winners (05 Super cups) : 2004–05, 2006–07, 2008–09, 2017–18, 2018–19
  Runners-Up (3) : 2016–17, 2019–20, 2020–21

Regional honours
African Club Championship :
 Runners up (1) :  2021

 Arab Clubs Championship  :
 Winners (1 cup) : 2019
 Runners-Up (2) : 1999, 2017
 Bronze Medalist (2) : 2000, 2020

Team

Current squad 2017–18

Head coaches
This is a list of the senior team's head coaches in the recent years.

As of 2018

See also
CS Sfaxien
CS Sfaxien (volleyball)
CS Sfaxien Women's Basketball

References

External links
Official Website
Facebook Official Page

Tunisian volleyball clubs
Volleyball clubs established in 1928
Sport in Tunisia